Svend Aage Castella (15 March 1890 in Copenhagen – 28 November 1938 in Copenhagen) was a Danish amateur football (soccer) player, who played for 13 games and scored one goal for the Denmark national football team.

Castella played his entire career with Copenhagen club KB, with whom he won several Danish football championships. He made his Danish national team debut in October 1911, and was a part of the Danish team at the 1912 Summer Olympics. He was an unused reserve player for the duration of the games, and was not awarded with a medal, as Denmark won silver medals in the 1912 football tournament.

Honors
KB
 Landsfodboldturneringen: Champions - 1912-1913, 1913-1914, 1916-1917, 1917-1918, 1921-1922
 Landsfodboldturneringen: Runners Up - 1915-1916

References

External links
Danish national team profile

1890 births
1938 deaths
Danish men's footballers
Kjøbenhavns Boldklub players
Denmark international footballers
Olympic footballers of Denmark
Footballers at the 1912 Summer Olympics
Association football defenders
Footballers from Copenhagen